888sport (pronounced as "Triple Eight Sport") is a multinational online sports gambling company headquartered in Gibraltar. It was founded in 2008 and is a subsidiary of 888 Holdings plc. The company provides online sports betting, predominantly in European markets.

History
888sport was launched as the dedicated sports arm of 888 Holdings in March 2008, and as part of 888's gambling arm. 888sport began to get involved in sports sponsorship in 2010, starting with a sponsored stand at Fontwell Park Racecourse.

Former Spanish national team footballer Santiago Cañizares joined 888sport in 2011 as European brand ambassador, in 2012 English former professional footballer Ian Wright as pundit during The Euros, and Channel 4 Racing presenter Emma Spencer joined in 2014 as horse racing expert.

888sport received media coverage for the way it utilised social media prior to and during the fight between George Groves and Carl Froch fight in 2014.

In 2013, the Nevada Gaming Commission licensed 888 Holdings to provide online gaming, making it one of the first non-US online betting companies to operate in the United States.

888sport is a member of ESSA, the European betting integrity body.

In March 2019, 888 paid £15 million for Dublin-based Dedsert Ltd, which provided the sportsbook platform for UK-licensed bookmaker BetBright. 888 CEO Itai Pazner said the acquisition “gives us the missing piece in our proprietary and technology portfolio.” In 2018, 888sport partnered with Caesars Atlantic City Casino to offer online sports betting to residents of New Jersey.

As of Dec. 15, 2021, the following message is appearing on the 888 Sport New Jersey website: 

888SPORT NEW JERSEY IS NO LONGER ACCEPTING OR OFFERING ANY SPORTS BETTING OPPORTUNITIES, AS OF DECEMBER 15TH.

References

External links

888 Holdings
Bookmakers
Internet properties established in 2008
2008 establishments in Gibraltar
Gambling websites